Selig is an unincorporated community in Adams County, in the U.S. state of Ohio.

History
A post office called Selig was established in 1886, and remained in operation until 1907. The community has the name of Hugo Selig, a local merchant.

References

Unincorporated communities in Adams County, Ohio
1886 establishments in Ohio
Populated places established in 1886
Unincorporated communities in Ohio